John Weston Allen (April 19, 1872 – January 1, 1942) was an American politician who served as a member of the Massachusetts House of Representatives from 1915 to 1918 and as Massachusetts Attorney General from 1920 to 1923.

As Attorney General, Allen was aggressive in his pursuit of white collar criminals. During his tenure, Allen prosecuted Thomas W. Lawson, L. C. Van Riper, and Charles Ponzi.

Instead of seeking reelection, Allen ran for Governor of Massachusetts in 1922 but lost the Republican primary election to incumbent Channing H. Cox. Allen served as a member of the United States Attorney General's National Crime Commission from 1926 to 1936 and was the commission's chairman from 1930 to 1936.

See also
 1915 Massachusetts legislature
 1917 Massachusetts legislature
 1918 Massachusetts legislature

References

 

1872 births
1942 deaths
Harvard Law School alumni
Massachusetts Attorneys General
Yale University alumni
Republican Party members of the Massachusetts House of Representatives
Politicians from Newton, Massachusetts
People from Waverly, Tioga County, New York